The Federal Financial Monitoring Service of the Russian Federation (known as Rosfinmonitoring) is a Federal Service that was created by a decree of President Vladimir Putin of November 1, 2001, and aimed to collect and analyze information about financial transactions in order to combat domestic and international money laundering, terrorist financing, and other financial crimes. The organization also provides lists of people accused of terrorist or "extremist" activities and books.

From November 1, 2001, to March 9, 2004, it was called Financial Monitoring Committee. It has been led by Viktor Zubkov from the very beginning.

Rosfinmonitoring is considered as Russia's main body for financial intelligence.

History 
Under Presidential Decree No. 1263 from November 1, 2001 "On the authorized body to counteract the legalization (laundering) of proceeds of crime", the Committee for Financial Monitoring of Russia (Комитет Российской Федерации по финансовому мониторингу) was born. The Presidential Decree came into force on February 1, 2002.

Following the adoption in September 2002 amendments to the Federal Law "On Combating Legalization (Laundering) of Proceeds from Crime and Financing of Terrorism", The Financial Monitoring Committee (KFM of Russia) functions have been enhanced with countering terrorism financing.

One of the committee's functions was to improve Russia's image in the international community: Russia at the time was in the "black list" of FATF. Through the efforts of FMK in October 2002, Russia was removed from the "black list", and in June 2003 the Committee became a member of the FATF.

On March 9, 2004, The Presidential Decree No. 314 ("On system and structure of the federal organs of the executive authority")  The Committee for Financial Monitoring transformed into the Federal Service for Financial Monitoring (Rosfinmonitoring).

Until September 2007 the Federal Financial Monitoring Service was administered by the Ministry of Finance of the Russian Federation. In accordance with Presidential Decree from September 24, 2007 (No. 1274, "On Issues of the structure of federal executive authorities) The Rosfinmonitoring become subordinate directly to the Government of the Russian Federation.

According to the Decree of the President of the Russian Federation from May 21, 2012 (№ 636; "On the structure of federal executive agencies"), the Federal Service for Financial Monitoring became under the authority of the President of Russia.

Location
Rosfinmonitoring is located between the Novokirovsky Prospekt and Myasnitskaya ulitsa, 39 in Moscow at the Tsentrosoyuz building which is named after Centrosoyuz and also houses Rosstat the Russian Federal State Statistics Service.

Directors 
 Viktor Zubkov (2001–2007), Head of Committee for Financial Monitoring
 Oleg Markov (2007–2008), Head of Rosfinmonitoring
 Yuri Chikhanchin (Since 2008), Director

See also 
 Moneyval – European equivalent
 FINTRAC – Canada's equivalent
 FinCEN – American equivalent
 AUSTRAC – Australian equivalent.
 Egmont Group of Financial Intelligence Units
 Asia/Pacific Group on Money Laundering
 Financial Action Task Force on Money Laundering

References

External links 

  (in Russian)
Банку России нашли надзирателя by Igor Moiseyev, Anna Inozemtseva, Svetlana Dementyeva. Kommersant, February 21, 2007.
 How Putin Uses Money Laundering Charges to Control His Opponents. The Atlantic

2001 establishments in Russia
Financial crime prevention
Financial regulatory authorities
Regulation in Russia
Russian intelligence agencies